Drupa aperta is a species of sea snail, a marine gastropod mollusk in the family Muricidae, the murex snails or rock snails.

References

 Blainville H.M.D. de. (1832). Disposition méthodique des espèces récentes et fossiles des genres Pourpre, Ricinule, Licorne et Concholepas de M. de Lamarck, et description des espèces nouvelles ou peu connues, faisant partie de la collection du Muséum d'Histoire Naturelle de Paris. Nouvelles Annales du Muséum d'Histoire Naturelle. 1: 189-263, pls 9-12.
 Valenciennes, A. (1846). Atlas de Zoologie. Mollusques. In: A. du Petit-Thouars, Voyage autour du monde sur la frégate la Venus pendant les années 1836–1839. 4 vols.
 Claremont M., Reid D.G. & Williams S.T. (2012) Speciation and dietary specialization in Drupa, a genus of predatory marine snails (Gastropoda: Muricidae). Zoologica Scripta 41: 137–149
 Claremont M., Vermeij G.J., Williams S.T. & Reid D.G. (2013) Global phylogeny and new classification of the Rapaninae (Gastropoda: Muricidae), dominant molluscan predators on tropical rocky seashores. Molecular Phylogenetics and Evolution 66: 91–102.

aperta
Gastropods described in 1832